Ernst Heinrich Friedrich Meyer (1 January 1791 – 7 August 1858) was a German botanist and botanical historian. Born in Hanover, he lectured in Göttingen and in 1826 became a professor of botany at the University of Königsberg, as well as Director of the Botanical Garden. His botanical specialty was the Juncaceae, or family of rushes. His major work was the four-volume Geschichte der Botanik (“History of Botany,” 1854–57). His history covered ancient authorities such as Aristotle and Theophrastus, explored the beginnings of modern botany in the context of 15th- and 16th-century intellectual practice, and offered a wealth of biographical data on early modern botanists. Julius von Sachs pronounced him “no great botanist” but admitted that he “possessed a clever and cultivated intellect.”

He died in Königsberg, East Prussia.

In 1828, he was honoured by Swiss botanist Augustin Pyramus de Candolle who named a genus of plants from tropical South America after him, Ernestia.

This botanist is denoted by the author abbreviation E.Mey. when citing a botanical name.

References 

German taxonomists
1791 births
1858 deaths
Botanists with author abbreviations
Scientists from Hanover
19th-century German botanists